is a department store retailer in Japan, whose best known store (commonly known as the Ginza Wako) is at the heart of the Ginza shopping district in Tokyo. This store is famous for its watches, jewellery, chocolate, porcelain, dishware, and handbags, as well as upscale foreign goods. There is an art gallery, called Wako Hall, on the sixth floor.

History
Wako was founded in 1881 by Kintarō Hattori as a watch and jewelry shop called K. Hattori (now Seiko Group Corporation) in Ginza. In 1947, the retail division split off as Wako Co., Ltd.

From 1894 to 1921, the Hattori Clock Tower stood on the site that Wako occupies today. In 1921, the Hattori Clock Tower was demolished to rebuild a new one. The reconstruction was delayed due to the Great Kantō earthquake of September 1, 1923. The new tower was completed in 1932 as the K. Hattori Building. In homage to its predecessor, the new store was also fitted with a clock.

The 1932 building was designed by Jin Watanabe in art deco influenced neoclassical style. Its curved granite façade and clock tower form the central landmark for the district and one of the few buildings in the area left standing after World War II. The building functioned as the Tokyo PX store during the Allied Occupation of Japan from 1945 to 1952. The clock tower plays the famous Westminster Chimes.

Wako has branches in Haneda Airport, Shinsaibashi, and some luxury hotels in Japan.

References

External links

Wako's web page
Images

Japanese companies established in 1881
Buildings and structures in Chūō, Tokyo
Clock towers
Ginza
Retail companies based in Tokyo
Retail companies established in 1881
Seiko
Art Deco architecture in Japan
Department store buildings